A mixed binomial process is a special point process in probability theory. They naturally arise from restrictions of (mixed) Poisson processes  bounded intervals.

Definition 
Let  be a probability distribution and let  be i.i.d. random variables with distribution . Let  be a random variable taking a.s. Assume that  are independent and let  denote the Dirac measure on the point .

Then a random measure  is called a mixed binomial process iff it has a representation as

Properties

Laplace transform 

for any positive, measurable function .

Restriction to bounded sets 
.

and some random variable .

Also if  is a Poisson process or a mixed Poisson process, then  is a mixed binomial process.

Examples  

Poisson-type random measures are a family of three random counting measures which are closed under restriction to a subspace, i.e. closed under thinning, that are examples of mixed binomial processes. They are the only distributions in the canonical non-negative power series family of distributions to possess this property and include the Poisson distribution, negative binomial distribution, and binomial distribution. Poisson-type (PT) random measures include the Poisson random measure, negative  binomial random measure, and binomial random measure.

References 

Point processes